Statistics of Qatar Stars League for the 1975–76 season.

Overview
Al-Rayyan Sports Club won the championship.

Top scorers

References
Qatar - List of final tables (RSSSF)

Qatar
1975–76 in Qatari football